The 89th Brigade was a formation of  the British Army. It was raised as part of the new army also known as Kitchener's Army and assigned to the 30th Division. It served on the Western Front and in the Italian Campaign during the First World War.

Formation
The infantry battalions did not all serve at once, but all were assigned to the brigade during the war.

17th Battalion, King's (Liverpool Regiment) (1st City of Liverpool)
18th Battalion, King's (Liverpool Regiment) (2nd City of Liverpool)
19th Battalion, King's (Liverpool Regiment) (3rd City of Liverpool)
20th Battalion, King's (Liverpool Regiment) (4th City of Liverpool)
2nd Battalion, Bedfordshire Regiment
7th Battalion, Bedfordshire Regiment
2nd Battalion, South Lancashire Regiment
7/8th Battalion, Royal Inniskilling Fusiliers
2/17th Battalion, London Regiment 
89th Machine Gun Company 	 
89th Trench Mortar Battery

References

Infantry brigades of the British Army in World War I
Pals Brigades of the British Army